Rudolph M. Clay Sr. (July 16, 1935June 4, 2013) was an American activist and politician who was active in Indiana politics as a member of the Democratic Party. Clay was first active in politics with his election to the Indiana Senate from the 3rd district, then served in local politics in Lake County, Indiana, and served as the 19th Mayor of Gary, Indiana. He was the first black person elected to the state senate from Lake County and the first black person elected countywide in Lake County.

Clay was born in Hillsboro, Alabama, and raised by his aunts following the death of his mother. He was educated at Roosevelt High School and Indiana University Bloomington. He served in the United States Army for two years as a Chaplain Assistant. He was active in the Civil rights movement, worked for a civil rights organization in Gary, Indiana, and was awarded by the Southern Christian Leadership Conference.

Clay entered electoral politics with his election to the state senate where he served one term before he was defeated in the Democratic primary by Representative Katie Hall. Following his tenure in the state senate he served on the Lake County Council, as recorder of Lake County, and on the Lake County Commission. He survived an assassination attempt after his election to the county commission. He was elected as mayor of Gary following the resignation of Mayor Scott L. King and served until 2012. He died in 2013.

Early life

Rudolph Clay Sr. was born in Hillsboro, Alabama, on July 16, 1935, to Willie and Maxie Clay. Following the death of his mother he was raised by his aunts Lucy Hunter and Daisy Washington. He graduated from Roosevelt High School in 1953, and attended Indiana University Bloomington. He married Christine Swan, with whom he had one child, in 1957. Clay was drafted into the United States Army in 1959, and served until he was honorably discharged in 1961. During his service in the army he mainly worked as a Chaplain Assistant.

Career

Civil rights

Clay was involved in the Civil rights movement and participated in marches led by Dr. Martin Luther King Jr. during the 1960s. He was award the Operation Breadbasket Outstanding Activist Award by the Southern Christian Leadership Conference in 1970. He worked as the public relations director for the United Viscounts, a civil rights organization in Gary, Indiana.

Indiana Senate

Elections

Clay ran for the Democratic nomination for a seat in the Indiana Senate from the 3rd district in 1972. He won in the primary against seven other candidates and defeated Republican nominee Fredrick Wood. He was the first black person to represent Lake County, Indiana in the state senate.

Clay ran for reelection to the state senate in the 1976 election, but was defeated in the Democratic primary by Representative Katie Hall. Clay was one of four incumbent Democratic members of the state senate to lose renomination. Clay filed lawsuit for a recount, but the recount maintained Hall's victory. Hall won in the general election without opposition.

Tenure

During his tenure Clay was the ranking minority member of the Public Health committee. He also served on the Affairs of Lake County, Legislative Apportionment, and Natural Resources, Ecology and Agriculture committees.

Clay and Representatives Jewell Harris and Robert Freeland, who were all black, boycotted a dinner at The Columbia Club that they were invited to as the club refused membership to black people. The Indiana NAACP gave support to the boycott.

During a riot in 1973, at the Indiana State Prison, where prisoners took control of three cellblocks and held three officers hostage, Clay offered to work as an intermediary in the negotiations. One of the officers was let go after the prisoners talked to Clay and the riot ended after thirty-five hours. The prisoners met a delegation consisting of reporters, Clay, and Representative Robert DuComb.

Local politics

In 1978, Clay filed to run for a seat on the Lake County, Indiana council from the 4th district. He defeated incumbent Councilor Frank Perry in the Democratic primary and won in the general election without opposition. He won reelection against Republican nominee Joseph Stojakovich in the 1982 election. During his tenure on the council Clay served as president.

On January 6, 1984, Clay announced that he would run for the Democratic nomination for Lake County Recorder to succeed William Bielski Jr., who was term-limited. He won the Democratic nomination against ten other candidates which included Johnny McWilliams, who had the support of Gary Mayor Richard G. Hatcher, Leonard Bielski, the brother of the incumbent recorder, and Mathias A. Kerger, a former member of the state senate. He defeated Republican nominee Alan L. Banister in the general election. He was the first black person elected countywide in Lake County. He resigned from the county council on December 30, 1984, to become county recorder.

Clay ran for a seat on the Lake County Commission from the 1st district, defeated incumbent Commissioner N. Atterson Spann Jr. and four other candidates in the Democratic primary, and defeated Republican nominee Fredrick Congress general election. Richard Blastick succeeded Clay as county recorder. On October 10, 1989, he announced that he would run for reelection to the county commission and won in the 1990 election.

On December 8, 1986, an assassination attempt was made against Clay when a sniper shot him three times in the shoulder and lower back after waiting outside his home. Two men were reported to have been involved in the attempted assassination. On December 12, he was sworn in on to the county commission earlier than the normal date so that Spann Jr., who would take over if Clay died, would not take over. Later an attack was made against Lake County Councilman Andrew Smith when two shotgun blasts were fired into Smith's home and Smith believed that the attack was related to the assassination attempt against Clay.

During his tenure as commissioner he was called a "traitor to the Democratic Party" by Representative Paul Hric for replacing county workers who were members of the Democratic Party with members of the Republican Party.

During the 1988 Democratic presidential primaries Clay ran as a delegate for Jesse Jackson despite attempts made by former Mayor Hatch and Jackson's presidential campaign to prevent them from appearing on the ballot. Clay won election as a delegate, but the Democratic National Committee's credentials committee selected Hatcher, who was the vice-chair of Jackson's campaign, to go to the convention instead of Clay while Barnes was sent to the convention instead of the Jackson-supported Carlos Tolliver. However, another decision was made where Barnes, Clay, Hatcher, and Tolliver would all attend the convention with half-voting power.

Clay ran to serve as chair of the Gary Democratic Precinct Organization and won on March 13, 1993, after defeating incumbent chair Richard Comer, who also served as Deputy Mayor.

Death and legacy

Clay died on June 4, 2013, in Gary. In 2014, a section of U.S. Route 20 that went through Gary was renamed in honor of Clay.

Political positions

Clay called for the United States House of Representatives to impeach President Richard Nixon in 1974.

Clay wrote a letter to President Gerald Ford informing him of his opposition to Ford's raising food stamp prices and he introduced a resolution in the state senate calling for Congress to reject Ford's proposed increase.

Amendments

The state senate voted thirty-four to sixteen, with Clay in favor, against ratifying the Equal Rights Amendment in 1973. In 1975, Clay introduced a resolution in the state senate calling for the United States Congress to pass an amendment to the United States Constitution to make the president elected through the popular vote instead of through the electoral college.

Crime and legal

The state senate voted forty to nine, with Clay against, in favor of maintaining the death penalty. In 1973, the state senate voted thirty-one to eighteen, with Clay against, in favor of legislation to allow local, county, and state police access to certain types of wire taps. Clay asked for George Phend, the Superintendent of Indiana State Reformatory, to allow prisoners to kiss their wives citing results from the policy at the prison in Terre Haute, Indiana where it helped rehabilitation and lowered homosexuality. Clay opposed a resolution by Senator Marlin McDaniel which would have the state legislature be put on record as opposing amnesty for people involved in prison disturbances. Superintendent Robert L. DeBard promised to Clay that forty more minorities would be admitted to the state police.

Civil rights

Clay opposed desegregation busing. Clay introduced legislation to recognize a state holiday in honor of Martin Luther King Jr. in 1974.

Electoral history

References

1935 births
2013 deaths
African-American male actors
African-American mayors in Indiana
African-American people in Indiana politics
American male actors
County commissioners in Indiana
Democratic Party Indiana state senators
Mayors of Gary, Indiana
Military personnel from Indiana
Deaths from cancer in Indiana
Deaths from prostate cancer
People from Lawrence County, Alabama
United States Army soldiers
20th-century African-American politicians
African-American men in politics
21st-century African-American politicians
20th-century American politicians
21st-century American politicians